Dinesh Khatik is an Indian politician and a member of the 17th Legislative Assembly of Uttar Pradesh representing the Hastinapur constituency and was a member of the Bhartiya Janata Party.

Early life and education 
Dinesh Khatik married Aarti in 2006 and was educated till 9th class.

Political career 
Dinesh Khatik is an Indian politician and a member of the Legislative Assembly of Uttar Pradesh representing the Hastinapur constituency and was a member of the Bhartiya Janata Party.He is currently a state minister in Uttar Pradesh government.

References 

1977 births
Living people
Bharatiya Janata Party politicians from Uttar Pradesh
Uttar Pradesh MLAs 2017–2022